Pargua is a village in Calbuco Comuna, in Los Lagos Region of Chile. It is located on the northeast side of the Chacao Channel. Pargua is on Route 5 (Ruta 5 Sur) and a ferry connects the village with the village of Chacao, Ancud Comuna at the northern end of Chiloé Island. There are plans to build the Chacao Channel bridge across the channel to replace the ferry.

Demographics
In the 1992 census Pargua was recorded with a population of 466, 244 men and 222 women, with more than half the population being under the age of fourteen. By 2002 the population had increased to 787, with 434 men and 353 women.

Notes and references

External links
  detailed map of Pargua

Port cities in Chile
Populated places in Llanquihue Province
Coasts of Los Lagos Region